Mateusz Masłowski (born 13 June 1997) is a Polish volleyball player. At the professional club level, he plays for Cerrad Enea Czarni Radom.

Personal life
His father Grzegorz Masłowski, is a former volleyball player, 1987 Polish Cup winner.

Career

Clubs
In May 2016 he signed a 3–year contract with the senior team of Asseco Resovia.

National team
On 23 April 2015 the Poland men's national under-19 volleyball team, including Masłowski, won a title of the U19 European Champion. They beat Italy in the final (3–1). He took part in the 2015 European Youth Olympic Festival with Polish national U19 team. On 1 August 2015 he achieved a gold medal (final match with Bulgaria 3–0). On 23 August 2015 Poland achieved its first title of the U19 World Champion. In the final his team beat hosts – Argentina (3–2). On 10 September 2016 he achieved a title of the U20 European Champion after winning 7 out of 7 matches in the tournament and beating Ukraine in the final (3–1). On 2 July 2017 Poland, including Masłowski, achieved a title of the U21 World Champion after beating Cuba in the final (3–0). His national team won 47 matches in the row and never lost. The U21 World Champion title ended up his time in youth national teams.

Honours

Clubs
 National championships
 2013/2014  Polish SuperCup, with Asseco Resovia
 2013/2014  Polish Championship, with Asseco Resovia

Youth national team
 2015  CEV U19 European Championship
 2015  European Youth Olympic Festival
 2015  FIVB U19 World Championship
 2016  CEV U20 European Championship
 2017  FIVB U21 World Championship

Universiade
 2019  Summer Universiade

References

External links

 
 Player profile at PlusLiga.pl
 Player profile at Volleybox.net

1997 births
Living people
People from Rzeszów
Polish men's volleyball players
Universiade medalists in volleyball
Universiade silver medalists for Poland
Medalists at the 2019 Summer Universiade
Resovia (volleyball) players
Czarni Radom players
Liberos